Morganite is an orange or pink variety of beryl and is also a gemstone. Morganite is mined in Brazil, Afghanistan, Mozambique, Namibia, the United States, and Madagascar.

Morganite has grown in popularity since 2010. Brides and CNN have even listed it as a good alternative to diamond.

Name 
Morganite is named after J. P. Morgan. 

Morganite is also known as pink beryl, rose beryl, pink emerald, and "cesian (or caesian) beryl".

Characteristics 
The pink color of morganite is attributed to Mn2+ ions. Morganite is pleochroic; when it is viewed down its c crystallographic axis the color is more pink.

In comparison to emerald, morganite lacks inclusions and fractures, thus making it more durable than emerald.

History 
Pink beryl of fine color and good sizes was first discovered on an island off the coast of Madagascar in 1910. It was also known, with other gemstone minerals, such as tourmaline and kunzite, at Pala, California. In December 1910, the New York Academy of Sciences named the pink variety of beryl "morganite" after financier J. P. Morgan.

On October 7, 1989, one of the largest gem morganite specimens ever uncovered, eventually called "The Rose of Maine", was found at the Bennett Quarry in Buckfield, Maine, US.

Before 2011, morganite was unknown in many jewelry stores. But, recently morganite has been increasing in popularity.

Value and popularity 
According to a 2017 survey, morganite is the second most popular non-diamond stone, after sapphire. A single carat of morganite can cost about $300.

Morganite is one of the rarest members of the beryl family, second only to red beryl. Due to the scarcity of morganites, especially those of high quality, they tend to be among the most expensive per carat. Ones that are deep pink in color tend to be the most valuable.

References 

Gemstones
Beryl group